John deJarnette Pemberton III (born June 1, 1981) is an American actor, comedian, podcast host and streamer from Rochester, Minnesota. He is best known for his role as the titular Son of Zorn in the short-lived Fox sitcom, and has also appeared as the recurring character Bo Thompson in the NBC sitcom Superstore.

Podcast
Pemberton hosts an experimental audio podcast (with eccentric vocal effects and eclectic music selections; especially reggae, prank phone calls, and guest interviews) called Live to Tape (previously known as Twisting the Wind) on Starburns Audio (formerly the Feral Audio Network).

Streaming 
Pemberton started streaming on Twitch in 2020. His weekly variety shows consist of DJing, "just chatting", interviews, gardening and playing video games.

Filmography

Film

Television

Web

References

External links
 
 
 Twisting the Wind (archived podcast)
 Live to Tape (current podcast)

1981 births
Living people
American male television actors
People from Rochester, Minnesota
Twitch (service) streamers